The Polish Greyhound (pronounced ) is a Polish sighthound breed. It is known as the Polish Greyhound, although it is not a direct relative of the Greyhound dog.

History

The first records for the existence of greyhounds in Poland come from the times of Gallus Anonymus. 12th century or 13th century is considered the beginnings of the breed's existence. Originally these dogs were used for hunting birds - great bustards. The Polish Greyhound was the favorite dog of the Polish nobility.

After World War II, breeding of this breed disappeared. Hunting with greyhounds was forbidden, and greyhound dogs were liquidated. Their keeping and breeding has been covered with a special permit, and this provision still applies. From the '70s up to the twentieth century began to reproduce the breed. Contemporary Polish Greyhound breeding was started by Stanisław Czerniakowski, who bought two females - Taiga and Struska, and one dog - Elbrus, in the vicinity of Rostov-on-Don. From the association of Taiga and Elbrus, the first litter of Polish greyhounds was born.

In 1989, the breed was entered in the register of the Fédération Cynologique Internationale (FCI).

Appearance
Polish Greyhounds have short, smooth fur that comes in many colors. The coat is somewhat heavier than a Greyhound. They have an undercoat that gets thicker in the winter. Polish Greyhounds have a long brush on the tail and have culottes at the rear of the thighs. The average Polish Greyhound weighs about 60 - 90  pounds, and ranges from 27 to 32 inches tall.
The Chart Polski has a smooth double coat, regardless of season, which is harsh to the touch while offering excellent insulation. The breed is a persistent hunter, with a long muscular neck, unlike the Greyhound, and the head is carried high. Large almond eyes are set in a slant, and the points of the hip bones are wide apart. The hind legs move closer together when the dog is moving at a short trot: this is called 'lacing'.

Temperament 
Polish Greyhounds, also called Chart Polski, are very active dogs. They are known to be protective and loyal. These dogs tend to be well-mannered and happy if trained and routinely exercised. They tend to be standoffish with strangers and are not fond of other dogs. They are good around kids, but supervision is recommended with young children.

Health Issues 
The biggest health concern for these dogs are cardiomyopathy and cancer. It is recommended to get cardiac blood and urine analysis during the dog's yearly physical examination, for optimal health.

See also
 Dogs portal
 List of dog breeds

References

Bibliography
Eva Maria Krämer: Rasy psów. Warszawa: Oficyna Wydawnicza MULTICO, 1998, s. 294. .
Goleman, M., Balicki, I., Radko, A., Rozempolska-Rucińska, I. and Zięba, G., 2021. Pedigree and Molecular Analyses in the Assessment of Genetic Variability of the Polish Greyhound. Animals, 11(2), p. 353.

External links

Chart Polski Association of America

FCI breeds
Sighthounds
Dog breeds originating in Poland
Rare dog breeds